Anahita is an Iranian goddess.

Anahita may also refer to:

Anahit, an Armenian goddess
Anahita (given name)
Anahita (spider), a genus of spider
270 Anahita, a minor planet designation: 270 Anahita

See also
Anaïs (disambiguation)
Nahid (disambiguation)
Nahida (disambiguation)
Temple of Anahita (disambiguation)